The 1966 United States Senate election in Kentucky took place on November 8, 1966. Incumbent Republican Senator John Sherman Cooper was elected to a second consecutive term in office, defeating Democrat John Y. Brown Sr. in a rematch of the 1946 special election.

Republican primary

Candidates
John Sherman Cooper, incumbent Senator since 1957
Thurman Jerome Hamlin, perennial candidate from London
Sam M. Ward

Results

Democratic primary

Candidates
John Y. Brown Sr., former U.S. Representative at-large and nominee for Senate in 1946
Jesse N.R. Cecil
James Ward Lentz
Gaines P. Wilson

Results

General election

Results

Results by county

See also
 1966 United States Senate elections

Notes

References 

1966
Kentucky
United States Senate